Euroregion Silesia is one of Euroregions in Poland and Czechia.

It was established in September 1998 under the agreement of the Association of Municipalities of the Upper Oder River Basin on the Polish side and the Regional Association of Czech-Polish Cooperation of Opole Silesia on the Czech side.

The Euroregion comprises 19 communes and cities on the Polish side (the districts of: Racibórz, Rybnik, Wodzisław in the Silesian Voivodeship and the district of Glubczyce in the Opole Voivodeship) and 19 communes and cities on the Czech side (Opava, Bruntál, Nový Jičín, Ostrava Districts).

The aim of the Euroregion is to undertake joint activities for the economic and social development of the region and to bring its inhabitants and institutions closer together. The Polish part of the Euroregion lies in the basin of the Upper Oder River and includes the Racibórz Basin, part of the Glubczyce Plateau and Ostrava Basin, while the Czech part lies in the basin of Opava and Moravia.

External links 
 Official homepage

See also 
Silesia 
List of euroregions

References 

Euroregions of Poland
Geography of the Czech Republic
Silesia